We Are Beautiful, We Are Doomed is the second album by British indie pop band Los Campesinos!. It was released in the UK on 27 October 2008 on Wichita Recordings.

The band initially did not consider We Are Beautiful, We Are Doomed to be their second album, instead considering it a mini-album or an "EEP" (Extended EP). By 2017, the band's members had relented to calling it their second album. Frontman Gareth Paisey explained to Noisey that "I myself get annoyed when long term fans say "Actually, it's an EP," because I want to be able to say that "my band has released six albums" not "my band has released five albums" because it makes us seem like we've been more important for longer."

The album's release came only 33 weeks after debut album Hold on Now, Youngster... and contains ten new tracks, none of which were released as singles. The album was recorded over an eleven-day recording session with John Goodmanson in his Seattle studio during June 2008.

The song "Miserabilia" was named the 94th best song of 2008 by Rolling Stone.

A remastered tenth anniversary edition was released 12 October 2018.

Packaging 
The CD version was released with an accompanying DVD featuring a short documentary of the band during their 2008 tour. The CD release also contains a 32-page booklet which, in addition to liner notes and lyrics, also includes drawings and poems from Jason Lytle of Grandaddy, Jamie Stewart of Xiu Xiu, Zac Pennington of Parenthetical Girls, Brent Knopf of Menomena and Ramona Falls, and Paul Heaton of The Housemartins and The Beautiful South, among others.

Critical reception 

Initial critical response was very positive. At Metacritic, which assigns a normalized rating out of 100 to reviews from mainstream critics, the album was met with universal acclaim, receiving an average score of 82, based on 22 reviews.

Track listing 
All tracks written by Gareth Paisey and Tom Bromley, except "Heart Swells/Pacific Daylight Time" co-written by Neil Turner and Zac Pennington.

 "Ways to Make It Through the Wall" – 4:12
 "Miserabilia" – 3:15
 "We Are Beautiful, We Are Doomed" – 3:54
 "Between an Erupting Earth and an Exploding Sky" – 1:16
 "You'll Need Those Fingers for Crossing" – 5:09
 "It's Never That Easy Though, Is It? (Song for the Other Kurt)" – 2:21
 "The End of the Asterisk" – 1:52
 "Documented Minor Emotional Breakdown #1" – 4:27
 "Heart Swells/Pacific Daylight Time" – 2:37
 "All Your Keyfabe Friends" – 3:15

Personnel 
 Aleksandra Berditchevskaia – vocals, keyboard
 Ellen Waddell – bass guitar
 Gareth Paisey – vocals, glockenspiel
 Harriet Coleman – violin, keyboard
 Neil Turner – guitar
 Ollie Briggs – drums
 Tom Bromley – lead guitar
 John Goodmanson – production, recording, mixing
 Jim Anderson – engineering

Charts

Release history

References 

2008 albums
Los Campesinos! albums
Arts & Crafts Productions albums
Wichita Recordings albums
Albums produced by John Goodmanson